Dukedom of Maura  is a hereditary  title of Spanish nobility. It was created on 19 June 1930 by King Alfonso XIII of Spain in favor of Gabriel Maura Gamazo, historian and politician.

Dukes of Maura (1930) 
 Gabriel Maura Gamazo, 1st Duke of Maura (1930–1963)
 Ramón Maura de Herrera, 2nd Duke of Maura (1963-1968)
 Gabriela Maura de Herrera, 3rd Duchess of Maura (1969-1972)
 Ramiro Pérez-Maura Herrera, 4th Duke of Maura (1973-2001)
 Ramiro Pérez-Maura de la Peña, 5th Duke of Maura (2003- incumbent)

References

Dukedoms of Spain
Noble titles created in 1930